The 2016 Uzbekistan First League was the 25th season of second level football in Uzbekistan since independence in 1992. In comparison to 2015 season in 2016 all clubs played two leg matches against each other without geographical split as years before.

Teams and locations

League table
Final standings
The last matchday matches were played on 12 November 2016

Last updated: 12 November 2016
Source: Soccerway

Top goalscorers

References

External links 
PFL - First league results 
Uzbekistan First League 2016 - soccerway

2016
2